The ancient archaeological site of Bunjikat, also named Shahriston, is located near the town of Bunjikat, in the Shahristan Pass at the entrance of the Ferghana Valley, in Sughd Province of western Tajikistan, just west of the town of Kairma.

Capital of Ustrushana
Bunjikat was the former capital city of the Principality of Ushrusana between the 6th and 9th Centuries CE. It replaced the older capital of Kurukada. From the 5th to the 7th century CE, Ustushana was part of the territory of the Hephthalites, followed by the Western Turks after 560 CE. The Principality probably retained a certain level of autonomy throughout this period, and was ruled directly by the afshins of the Kavus dynasty. Bunjikat maintained its sovereignty until 893 CE.

Ruins
Several large buildings and fortresses are located in Bunjikat, such as Kalai Kahkaha I (a Palace) and Kalai Kahkaha II (a grand building on an elevated terrace), dated from the 6th to 8th century CE.

Works of art
The paintings of Bunjikat are among the most important of Sogdian art.

World Heritage Status 

This site was added to the UNESCO World Heritage Tentative List on November 9, 1999 in the Cultural category.

References

Archaeological sites in Tajikistan
World Heritage Sites in Tajikistan
Former populated places in Tajikistan